Scott L. Pleus is a lieutenant general in the United States Air Force. Pleus is Deputy Commander, United States Forces Korea; Commander, Air Component Command United Nations Command; Commander, Air Component Command, Combined Forces Command; and Commander, Seventh Air Force. He is also the United States representative to the joint committee for the Status of Forces agreement between the two countries.

Air Force career
Pleus received his commission in 1989 through the Air Force ROTC program at the University of Minnesota Duluth. During his career, he has commanded at the squadron, group and wing levels and was a Secretary of Defense Corporate Fellow at Sun Microsystems in California. His staff assignments include Executive Officer to the Chief of Staff of the United States Air Force. Prior to his current assignment, he was the Director of Air and Cyberspace Operations, Headquarters Pacific Air Forces, Joint Base Pearl Harbor-Hickam, Hawaii.

Pleus is a command pilot with more than 2,500 flying hours, with combat hours earned during Operations Desert Fox and Southern Watch.

Education
 1989 Bachelor of Arts, Communications, University of Minnesota-Duluth 1997 Squadron Officer School, Maxwell Air Force Base, Ala.
 2000 Master of Military Operational Arts and Science, Air Command and Staff College, Maxwell AFB, Ala. 2000 Master of Arts, International Relations, Auburn University-Montgomery, Ala.
 2002 Air War College, Maxwell Air Force Base, Ala., by correspondence
 2008 Secretary of Defense Corporate Fellow, Sun Microsystems, Menlo Park, Calif.
 2010 U.S. Air Force Enterprise Leadership Seminar, Darden School of Business, University of Virginia, Charlottesville 2015 Capstone General and Flag Officer Course, National Defense University, Washington, D.C.
 2015 Joint Force Air Component Commander Course, Maxwell AFB, Ala. 2018 Joint Flag Officer Warfighting Course, Maxwell AFB, Ala.

Assignments
 March 1990 – March 1991, Student, undergraduate pilot training, Columbus Air Force Base, Miss.
 April 1991 – December 1992, Student, F-16 Replacement Training Unit, MacDill AFB, Fla.
 January 1993 – January 1996, F-16 Pilot, 18th Fighter Squadron, Eielson AFB, Alaska
 January 1996 – December 1996, F-16 Flight Examiner and Instructor, 35th Fighter Squadron, Kunsan Air Base, South Korea
 January 1997 – June 1999, Flight Commander, F-16 Flight Examiner and Instructor, 34th Fighter Squadron, Hill AFB, Utah
 June 1999 – June 2000, Student, Air Command and Staff College, Maxwell AFB, Ala.
 July 2000 – September 2000, Student, Joint Forces Staff College, Norfolk Naval Air Station, Va.
 September 2000 – November 2002, Joint and Combined Contingency Plans Officer, Alaskan Command, Plans and Programs, Joint Base Elmendorf-Richardson, Alaska
 November 2002 – April 2003, Student, F-16 requalification training, 61st Fighter Squadron, Luke AFB, Ariz.
 May 2003 – June 2004, Operations Officer, 56th Training Squadron, Luke AFB, Ariz.
 June 2004 – June 2006, Commander, 63rd Fighter Squadron, Luke AFB, Ariz.
 12, June 2006 – June 2008, Director, Headquarters AETC Command Action Group, Randolph AFB, Texas
 June 2008 – July 2009, Secretary of Defense Corporate Fellow, Sun Microsystems, Menlo Park, Calif.
 July 2009 – May 2011, Commander, 611th Air and Space Operations Center, JB Elmendorf-Richardson, Alaska
 May 2011 – May 2012, Commander, 8th Fighter Wing, Kunsan AB, South Korea
 June 2012 – June 2014, Executive Officer to the Chief of Staff of the Air Force, Headquarters U.S. Air Force, the Pentagon, Arlington, Va.
 June 2014 – June 2016, Commander, 56th Fighter Wing, Luke AFB, Ariz.
 July 2016 – May 2017, Director, F-35 Integration Office, Headquarters U.S. Air Force, the Pentagon, Arlington, Va.
 June 2017 – May 2019, Director, Plans, Programs, and Requirements, Headquarters Air Combat Command, Joint Base Langley-Eustis, Va.
 June 2019 – June 2020, Director of Air and Cyberspace Operations, Headquarters Pacific Air Forces, JB Pearl Harbor-Hickam, Hawaii
 June 2020 – present, Deputy Commander, United States Forces Korea; Commander, Air Component Command, United Nations Command; Commander, Air Component Command, Combined Forces Command; and Commander, Seventh Air Force, Pacific Air Forces, Osan AB, Republic of Korea

Flight information
 Rating:  command pilot
 Flight hours:  more than 2,500
 Aircraft flown:  F-35, F-16 C/D, AT-38, T-38, and T-37

Effective dates of promotions

References

Air Command and Staff College alumni
Auburn University alumni
Living people
Recipients of the Air Force Distinguished Service Medal
Recipients of the Legion of Merit
United States Air Force generals
University of Minnesota Duluth alumni
Year of birth missing (living people)